Dahon is the world's largest manufacturer of folding bicycles with a two-thirds marketshare in 2006.  The company was founded in 1982 by David T. Hon, a former laser physicist, and is headquartered in Los Angeles, California, with assembly factories in China, Macau and Bulgaria. Dahon markets bicycles under its own name as well as other brand names, including the affiliated Yeah and Biceco Brands, and Novara for REI in the U.S.  The company is a member of the Global Alliance for EcoMobility. Dahon holds over 200 patents, some having become industry standards.

Company

History
Dahon was founded in 1982 as Hon California, Inc.. After presenting his invention to several established but uninterested companies, Hon and his brother Henry Hon decided to establish their own company from scratch.  The two gathered venture funding and established their headquarters in Southern California while Hon relocated to Taiwan to build Dahon's first factory. Two years later, in 1984, Dahon folding bicycles were rolling off the assembly line as one of the most compact folding bicycle on the market at that time (many will argue the Brompton Bicycle is a more compact folder).

Production

Primary production takes place in the company’s factory in Shenzhen, China. Another facility, near Beijing, produces Dahon bikes for China, an increasingly profitable market for the U.S.-based company.
Beginning in 2012, all Dahon brand bikes destined for Europe have been made in Bulgaria. In a strategic partnership with Maxcom Ltd., the company set up a production base at one of the facilities on the continent. All of their bikes for the European market are made at the facility in Plovdiv.

Marketing
In 2012, Dahon launched its first global advertising campaign, incorporating a two-tiered marketing campaign specifically designed for both b2b and  b2c markets. Dahon introduced the new tagline, “freedom unfolds”. The new global campaign, themed “Express Your Personality” was launched at Eurobike 2011 in Friedrichshafen, Germany in a live-stage performance.

Folding bikes

 

Most Dahon bicycles use a patented, single-hinge frame design where the handlebar folds down and the frame hinge swings to the left, leaving the handlebar inside, whereas models such as the Jifo and EEZZ take advantage of new, vertical folding technology. The biggest sellers are those with 16 or 20 inch wheels, but models are available with wheels from 12 inches to 700C. In terms of gearing, bikes can feature derailleurs or hub gears, or both or none.
For 2013 Dahon offers 30 models of folding or portable bicycles in wheel sizes ranging from 16-26” with aluminum alloy or steel frames. One of the company's best selling bikes is the Boardwalk, an entry-level, steel-frame commuter bike.

Special bikes
In 2008, to celebrate 25 years of production, Dahon produced a special edition based on the Mµ series of bikes - the Mµ XXV. 250 of these machines were produced. In March 2009, they announced that they would produce 1,000 sets of a special edition bike based on its Curve D3 folding bike with the Spanish design firm Kukuxumusu. 2012 marked the company's 30th anniversary, and Dahon produced 300 limited edition bikes to honor the occasion. The bicycles are based on the popular Mµ frame and feature high-end carbon parts.

In March 2017, released a new model called the Curl, in celebration of the company's 35th anniversary. They decided to bring end users into the process by launching a Kickstarter campaign to fund production of the bike. The Kickstarter campaign allowed for more involvement in the production process by manufacturers, dealers, distributors, and riders.

In June 2017, they announced the release of a special anniversary bike based on the Curl - the Curl i8. The bike was limited to a run of 500 that were available world wide with riders having to sign up to pre-order the bike. Those that preordered the bike had the opportunity to have their signature etched onto the bike frame.

Awards
Dahon has achieved various industry awards and honors over the years, including the Eurobike award, given at the world's largest bike show.

Controversy
Beginning in 2011, Dahon North America Inc. was in litigation with the son and wife of the company's founder. Specifically, the lawsuit charged that Joshua Hon and Florence Hon breached their fiduciary duties as officers of Dahon and unlawfully appropriated company assets, resources, and intellectual property to start the competing companies Mobility Holdings and Tern. As of March 2013, a settlement was reached on mutually acceptable and confidential terms and the matter is closed.

Events

Smithfield Nocturne Folding Bike Race
The 2008, 2009, 2010, and 2012 winners of the Smithfield Nocturne folding bike race, held in the market district of Smithfield, London, rode Dahon folding bikes. The 2012 winner, Jeroen Janssen, pedaled to victory on the 30th Anniversary limited edition bike. Dahon also sponsored the annual event from 2007 to 2010.

References

Bibliography 

Folding bicycles
Cycle manufacturers of the United States
Manufacturing companies based in California
Privately held companies based in California